Associação Atlética Portuguesa may refer to:

Associação Atlética Portuguesa (RJ), a football club based in Rio de Janeiro, Brazil
Associação Atlética Portuguesa (Santos), a football club based in Santos, Brazil
Associação Portuguesa de Desportos, a football club based in São Paulo, Brazil